Four Words to Stand On is the first extended play (EP) released by Northern Irish indie rock band Two Door Cinema Club, released in Belfast on 26 March 2008. The album was released elsewhere on 20 January 2009. On March 23, 2018, for the first time the band shared the EP online to celebrate its 10-year anniversary. It could be played on Spotify, Apple Music and other streaming services.

Track listing

References 

2008 EPs
Two Door Cinema Club albums